Aphanostephus ramosissimus is a North American species of flowering plants in the family Asteraceae, with the common name plains lazydaisy. It is native to the southwestern and south-central United States, the states of Arizona, New Mexico, Texas, and Oklahoma, as well as to central and northern Mexico as far south as Puebla and Michoacán.

Description
Aphanostephus ramosissimus is an annual herb up to 45 cm (18 inches) tall. It produces multiple flowers, each containing a few dozen long, thin, white petals that radiate from a yellow central disc. 

Varieties
Aphanostephus ramosissimus var. humilis (Benth.) B.L.Turner & Birdsong 
Aphanostephus ramosissimus var. ramosus (DC.) B.L.Turner & Birdsong 
Aphanostephus ramosissimus var. ramosissimus

References

External links
Lady Bird Johnson Wildflower Center, University of Texas
SEInet Southwestern Biodiversity, Arizona Chapter
Conabioi ficha informativa, Aphanostephus ramosissimus DC. in Spanish with photos
Calphotos photos gallery, University of California

Astereae
Flora of Mexico
Flora of Arizona
Flora of New Mexico
Flora of Oklahoma
Flora of Texas
Plants described in 1836
Taxa named by Augustin Pyramus de Candolle
Flora without expected TNC conservation status